Hiren Bhattacharyya (28 July 1932 – 4 July 2012), popularly known as Hiruda, was an Indian poet and lyricist best for his works in the Assamese literature. He had innumerable works published in Assamese and achieved many prizes and accolades for his poetry. In 2012, Bhattacharyya died at hospital due to undergoing treatment for lung and urinary infection since 14 June.

Biography

Bhattacharyya was born in Jorhat, Assam in the year 1932. After battling for life almost three months, he died on 4 July 2012 in Guwahati, Assam. He is survived by his wife and daughter.

Literary works
Bhattacharyya mainly worked in the field of Assamese poetry. He was the editor of several Assamese magazines and newspapers. Some of the newspapers he worked on are Chitrabon, Monon and Antorik. He was the poetry editor of the Assamese magazine Prantik for over three decades.

 Books
He published anthologies of poetry include:
 ৰৌদ্ৰ কামনা (Roudro Kamona),(1968)
 কবিতাৰ ৰ'দ (Kobitar Rod ), (1976)
 তোমাৰ বাঁহী (Tomar Bahi)
 সুগন্ধি পখিলা (Xugondhi Pokhilaa), (1981)
 মোৰ  দেশ আৰু প্ৰেমৰ কবিতা (Mor Desh aru Mor Premor Kobita), (1972)
 বিভিন্ন দিনৰ কবিতা (Bibhinno Dinor Kobita)
 শইচৰ পথাৰ মানুহ (Shoichor Pothar Manuh ), (1991)
 মোৰ প্ৰিয় বৰ্ণমালা (Mur Prio Bornomala), (1995)
 ভালপোৱাৰ বুকু মাটি (Bhalpuwar Buka Mati), (1995)
 ভালপোৱাৰ দিকচৌ বাটেৰে (Bhalpuwar Dikchou Batere), (2000)

 Collections of nursery rhymes
 ল'ৰা ধেমালি (Lora Dhemali ) (1991)
 অকন ধেমালি (Akon Dhemali )(1991)

 Others
 Ancient Gongs (English Translation)
 জোনাকী মন ও অন্যান্য (Jonaki Mon O Onyano) etc. (Bengali Translation)
 Autumn and other landscapes (Translated to English) 

Few sample stanzas from his famous Assamese poems are:

Awards
Bharatiya Bhasha Parishad Award in 1993.
 Bishnu Rabha Award, 1985
 Rajaji Puroskar, 1984-85 awarded by Bharatiya Bidya Bhawan
 Soviet Desh Neheru Award, 1987
 Sahitya Akademi Award in 1992 for his anthology of poems 'Saichor Pathar Manuh'.
 Assam Valley Literary Award, (Asom Upotyoka Sahitya Bota) 2000 awarded by Megor Sikhya Nyash

See also
Jayanta Mahapatra
Jyoti Prasad Agarwala
Vegunta Mohan Prasad

References

External links

 Blogger page of the Author
 His Poems at Xofura
 Oxom Yearbook 2003, Xoraaighaat Prokaaxon, December 2003
 http://www.poetrytranslation.org/poets/hiren-bhattacharjya
 Audio links
 Some of his poems in audio format sung by Pulok Benarjee
 Book Search
 Encyclopaedia of Indian Literature: A-Devo - Google Books Result

1932 births
2012 deaths
Assamese-language poets
People from Jorhat district
Poets from Assam
Deaths from respiratory tract infection
Deaths from urinary tract infection
Recipients of the Sahitya Akademi Award in Assamese
Recipients of the Assam Valley Literary Award
20th-century Indian poets